Dominique Jacques de Eerens  (17 March 1781 – 30 May 1840) was a Dutch major general, politician and administrator, Governor-General of the Dutch East Indies and knight of the Military William Order.

References

External links 

 
 

1781 births
1840 deaths
Dutch military personnel of the Napoleonic Wars
Governors-General of the Dutch East Indies
People from Alkmaar